Aleksandr Vladimirovich Seredokhin (born 1 April 1977) is a former Russian professional football player.

Club career
He played two seasons in the Russian Football National League for FC Rubin Kazan and FC Avangard Kursk.

External links
 

1977 births
People from Maloyaroslavetsky District
Living people
Russian footballers
Association football midfielders
FC Rubin Kazan players
FC Avangard Kursk players
FC Lokomotiv Kaluga players
Sportspeople from Kaluga Oblast